Barry Murphy (born 19 April 1888) was an Irish hurler who played as a goalkeeper for the Cork senior team.

Murphy made his first appearance for the team during the 1914 championship and was a regular member of the starting fifteen at various times until his retirement after the 1919 championship. During that time he won one Munster medal. Murphy was an All-Ireland runner-up on one occasion.

At club level Murphy was a one-time county intermediate championship medalist with Cloughduv.

His brothers, Dinny and John Barry-Murphy, also played with Cork.

References

1888 births
Year of death missing
Cloughduv hurlers
Cork inter-county hurlers
Hurling goalkeepers